Labidochromis strigatus is a species of cichlid endemic to Lake Malawi where it is only known to occur in areas with rocky substrates around Likoma Island and Chisumulu Island.  This species can reach a length of  SL.  It can also be found in the aquarium trade.

References

Fish of Malawi
strigatus
Fish described in 1982
Taxonomy articles created by Polbot
Fish of Lake Malawi